NTT DoCoMo Red Hurricanes Osaka is a Japanese rugby union team owned by NTT DoCoMo. They qualified for the 2011–12 season and finished 12th place overall. The team rebranded in 2022, ahead of the rebranding of the Top League to the Japan Rugby League One.

Squad

The NTT DoCoMo Red Hurricanes Osaka squad for the 2023 season is:

References

External links

Japan Rugby League One teams
Nippon Telegraph and Telephone
NTT Docomo
1993 establishments in Japan
Rugby clubs established in 1993